Santhwanam is a 1991 Indian Malayalam-language film directed by Sibi Malayil, starring Nedumudi Venu, Meena and Bharathi.

The film is famous for the song "Unni Vaavaa Vo, Ponnunni Vaavaa Vo...".

The film is a remake of 1991 January-hit Telugu movie Seetharamaiah Gari Manavaralu which was also remade in Kannada as Belli Modagalu starring Doddanna, Jayanthi, Ramesh Aravind & Malashree in Lead roles.

Cast
Nedumudi Venu as Rajasekaran Thambi
Suresh Gopi as Rajakumaran Thambi, Thambi's son
Meena as Rajalakshmi
Bharathi as Subhadra
Jagathy Sreekumar as Kunjunni Nair
M. S. Thripunithura Thambi's Friend
Murali as John
Zainuddin as Venu, Bank staff
Rekha as Thambi's Niece
Mamukkoya as Kareem bhai, Boat Driver
Bindu Ramakrishnan as Thambi's relative

Soundtrack 
The film's soundtrack contains 3 songs, all composed by Mohan Sithara and with Lyrics by Kaithapram.

References

1990s Malayalam-language films
Malayalam remakes of Telugu films
Films scored by Mohan Sithara